Lan Kwai Fong 2 is a 2012 blue comedy film directed by Wilson Chin and produced by Li Kuo Hsing. Lan Kwai Fong 2 is the sequel to Lan Kwai Fong and is the second film in the Lan Kwai Fong theatrical series. It was released in Hong Kong, Macao and New Zealand on 23 August 2012, and grossed over $11,031,668 in Hong Kong. It was followed by sequels Lan Kwai Fong 3. The film stars Shiga Lin, Sammy Sum, Izumt Liu, Avis Chan, and Boey Chan.

Cast

Main cast
 Shiga Lin as Summer.
 Kelvin Kwan as Rain.
 Sammy Sum as Don.
 Izumi Liu as Siri.
 Avis Chan as Avis.
 Mia Chan as QQ.
 Linah Matsuoka as Maxim.
 Ho Hou-Man as fai.

Other
 Cheuk Wan-chi
 Angelina Zhang as Angelina.
 Adason Lo as A Wei.
 Daniel Chau as A Bo.
 Benedict Zhuang
 Sita Chan as Sita.
 Liddy Li
 Jaime Fong
 Chiang Man Kit
 Vanko Wong
 Calinda Yuen-wai Chan
 Naomi Fung
 Jason Chung

Guest star
 Leo Ku
 Niki Chow
 Suen Yiu-wai
 Alex Fong
 William So
 Timmy Hung
 Jacquelin Chong
 Gregory Wong
 Ricky Fan
 Joey Tang
 Wang Xiao

Music
 Leo Ku - No longer love
 Shiga Lin - Live well, I'm still loving you
 Kelvin Kwan - I'm nothing, Feat
 Benedict Zhuang - LKF Party People
 Imagine Dragons - Radioactive
 Sita Chan - Backup
 Jaden Michaels - Get Crazy
 Kaliyo (Sarah Sharp & Andrea Perry) - "Find Your Way"
 24Herbs & Janice Vidal - "Wonderland"

Released
The film premiered in Hong Kong, Macao and New Zealand on 23 August 2012.

The film grossed $11,031,668 in Hong Kong and it was only moderately successful with critics.

References

External links

2012 films
2010s Cantonese-language films
2012 romantic comedy films
Films set in Hong Kong
Films shot in Hong Kong
Hong Kong romantic comedy films
2010s Mandarin-language films